Ptereleotris arabica is a species of dartfish in the family Microdesmidae.

References 

Animals described in 1985
arabica